Marat Safin defeated Radek Štěpánek in the final, 6–3, 7–6(7–5), 6–3 to win the singles tennis title at the 2004 Paris Masters. It was his third Paris Masters title and 14th career singles title overall. Safin also became the first man to win the final two Masters tournaments of the season, after the Madrid Masters the week before.

Tim Henman was the defending champion, but lost in the third round to Mikhail Youzhny.

Seeds 
A champion seed is indicated in bold text while text in italics indicates the round in which that seed was eliminated.  All sixteen seeds received a bye into the second round.

Draw

Finals

Top half

Section 1

Section 2

Bottom half

Section 3

Section 4

References 

 2004 BNP Paribas Masters Draw

Singles